Optic lobe refers to brain structures involved in vision:
The superior colliculus of mammals or the analogous optic tectum of other vertebrates, structures of the midbrain involved in vision
Optic lobes of arthropods

Neuroanatomy